Stuessya is a genus of Mexican plants in the tribe Heliantheae within the family Asteraceae.

 Species
 Stuessya apiculata (S.F.Blake) B.L.Turner & F.G.Davies - Michoacán, Guerrero
 Stuessya perennans B.L.Turner & F.G.Davies - Michoacán
 formerly included
see Viguiera 
 Stuessya michoacana - Viguiera michoacana

References

Heliantheae
Endemic flora of Mexico
Asteraceae genera
Taxa named by Billie Lee Turner
Taxa named by Frances G. Davies